Robert Patrick John Finn (born December 19, 1945) is an American scholar of Turkish Studies and International Relations, and was the first United States ambassador to Afghanistan in more than 20 years, from March 22, 2002, until August 1, 2004. He was succeeded by Zalmay Khalilzad.

Life
Finn grew up in the Parkchester planned community in the Bronx, in New York City and earned a B.A. in American Literature and European History with honors from St. John's University, an M.A. in Near Eastern Studies from New York University and an M.A. and a Ph.D. in Near Eastern Studies from Princeton University in 1978. Finn's doctoral dissertation was titled "The early Turkish novel: 1872-1900." 
He currently holds a professorship there in Turkic studies and international relations. He speaks fifteen languages, including most Central Asian tongues.

Finn was a member of the Foreign Service from 1978 to August 2005.  
In 1992, he opened (as chargé d'affaires) the United States embassy to Azerbaijan and served as charge and deputy chief of mission there for three years. 
He also served as the U.S. ambassador to Tajikistan from 1998 through 2001.  
He has also served in Turkey, Croatia and Pakistan.

Works
 The Early Turkish Novel, 1872-1900 (Isis Press, 1984)
Translations

Editor
(with Wolfgang F. Danspeckgruber) of Building State and Security in Afghanistan (Woodrow Wilson School of Public and International Affairs, Princeton University, 2007); Liechtenstein Institute on Self-Determination, 2007,

References

External links

1945 births
Living people
Ambassadors of the United States to Azerbaijan
Ambassadors of the United States to Tajikistan
Ambassadors of the United States to Afghanistan
St. John's University (New York City) alumni
Princeton University alumni
New York University alumni
United States Foreign Service personnel
Politicians from the Bronx
Parkchester, Bronx
20th-century American diplomats
21st-century American diplomats